Fred Brooks (5 May 1908 – 30 June 1996) was a former Australian rules footballer who played with Carlton in the Victorian Football League (VFL). Brooks later played for and coached Williamstown. In six seasons with 'Town, he missed just one game, with influenza in 1933, and totalled 111 games and 3 goals from 1932-37. Brooks was captain-coach in 1935, won the Club best and fairest and tied for the VFA Medal. He was runner-up in the Club best and fairest in 1936 and 1937. Brooks received life membership for his six seasons of service and is a member of the WFC Hall of Fame.

Notes

External links 

Fred Brooks's profile at Blueseum

1908 births
1996 deaths
Carlton Football Club players
Australian rules footballers from Victoria (Australia)
Williamstown Football Club players
Williamstown Football Club coaches